Felaniella zelandica is a species of medium-sized marine bivalve mollusc in the family Ungulinidae.

References
 Powell A. W. B., William Collins Publishers Ltd, Auckland 1979 
 Morley, M. S., Photographic Guide to Seashells of New Zealand, New Holland Publishers (NZ) Ltd, 2004 

Ungulinidae
Bivalves of New Zealand
Bivalves described in 1835